Scott Harry Faulring (August 11, 1956 - June 29, 2018) is an American historian and document editor connected with the early history of the Church of Jesus Christ of Latter-day Saints (LDS Church).  He has published with both the Foundation for Ancient Research and Mormon Studies and Signature Books.

Biography 

Faulring was born in the vicinity of Niagara Falls, New York.  He joined the United States Air Force as a young man.  While in the Air Force he became a member of LDS Church.

Faulring received his bachelor's degree in history from Brigham Young University in 1983.  He then continued with the Air Force where he spent much of his time in Vogelweh, Germany and then in Izmir, Turkey.  Also during this time he received a MPA degree from Troy State University.  He later returned to BYU as an instructor with the Air Force ROTC there.  After retiring from the Air Force, Faulring became a research historian with the Joseph Fielding Smith Institute for Church History.

Writings 

One of his earliest projects was the publication of the journals of Joseph Smith, Jr. His commentary at times has been faulted for poor and misleading readings of the text, and his summary provided by Signature Books has been criticized for being overly harsh on Smith.

On the other hand, Faulring later wrote with Richard Lloyd Anderson a review of Todd Compton's In Sacred Loneliness, in which they jointly affirmed their faith in Smith as a prophet of God and criticized Compton's use of second-hand sources and even more heavily his use of the term polyandry.

Faulring has also edited a collection of documents on Oliver Cowdery and a book on the Joseph Smith Translation of the Bible.  Faulring has also published material with the Mormon Historic Sites Foundation.

Notes

References
Signature Books report on Joseph Smith papers
FARMS bio
Bio from Faulring's papers in the University of Utah archives

External links 
 

1956 births
21st-century American historians
American male non-fiction writers
American Latter Day Saint writers
Brigham Young University alumni
Brigham Young University faculty
Converts to Mormonism
Historians of the Latter Day Saint movement
Living people
People from Niagara Falls, New York
Troy University alumni
Latter Day Saints from New York (state)
Historians from New York (state)
21st-century American male writers